Lucille Lambert was Miss Hollywood and Miss California 1942. She finished fourth runner up at Miss America 1942.

References

Living people
People from California
American beauty pageant winners
Year of birth missing (living people)